Trial Marriage is a 1929 American pre-Code drama film directed by Erle C. Kenton from a story by Sonya Levien. Produced by Harry Cohn for Columbia Pictures Corporation, the film was released on March 10, 1929. Charles C. Coleman was assistant director. The film was released in two versions, in silent and with sound.

Premise 
Constance Bannister (Sally Eilers) enters into a trial marriage contract with Dr. Thorvald Ware (Jason Robards) and finds happiness with him. She defies his wishes by dancing at a charity ball in a revealing costume, however, and he dissolves the contract, not knowing that she is with a child.

Cast 
Norman Kerry as Oliver Mowbray
Sally Eilers as Constance Bannister
Jason Robards as Dr. Thorvald Ware
Thelma Todd as Grace
Charles Clary as George Bannister
Naomi Childers as Mrs. George Bannister, 1st
Rosemary Theby as Mrs. George Bannister, 4th
Gertrude Short as Prudence

Production 
The June 29, 1928 issue of The Film Daily announced that Millard Webb was originally supposed to direct, however he was ultimately not involved in the final film.

Reception 
A negative review from Variety on April 17, 1929 wrote: "An uninteresting story given a trite, long-winded, complicated treatment, with no redeeming features in the picturization."

References

External links 
 
 

Films directed by Erle C. Kenton
American drama films
1929 drama films
1929 films
American black-and-white films
1920s English-language films
1920s American films